This is a list of the historic counties of Wales as recorded by the 1891 census, ordered by their area.

References
1891 census

 
1891 United Kingdom census
Ancient
1891 in Wales